The Pellegrin's barb (Enteromius pellegrini) is a species of cyprinid fish.

It is found in Burundi, Rwanda, Tanzania, and Uganda.
Its natural habitat is rivers.
It is not considered a threatened species by the IUCN.

References

Enteromius
Cyprinid fish of Africa
Taxa named by Max Poll
Fish described in 1939
Taxonomy articles created by Polbot